Hassan Saab (15 October 1922 – 25 July 1990) was a Lebanese diplomat and political scientist. Saab was born in October 1922 and died in July 1990 at the age of 67.

Works
Although most of Saab's work has been published in Arabic, some work is available in English:
 The Arab federalists of the Ottoman Empire, 1958
 'The Rationalist School in Lebanese Politics', in 
 Zionism and racism, 1968

References

1922 births
1990 deaths
Lebanese diplomats
Lebanese political scientists
20th-century political scientists